Forestburg is an unincorporated community in Montague County, Texas, United States.  The ZIP Code for Forestburg is 76239.

Education
The community of Forestburg is served by the Forestburg Independent School District and home to the Forestburg High School Longhorns.  With its K-12 campus serving approx. 210 students, the class sizes are small and allow for one on one attention.

References

External links
 

Unincorporated communities in Texas
Unincorporated communities in Montague County, Texas